Santa Marta al Collegio Romano is a deconsecrated church located in the Piazza del Collegio Romano in the Rione Pigna of Rome, Italy. 

A House of Saint Martha was founded in 1543 by St Ignatius of Loyola to rehabilitate women considered of poor morals, because they were adulterous or married women shamelessly living in public sin without fear of God or men Saint Martha is considered the patron saint of married women. The church became a monastery, and by 1560 was under the Augustinian order. The church was consecrated in 1696, with a reconstruction by  Carlo Fontana. Deconsecrated by Napoleonic invasions, it presently functions as a cultural center. 

The interior art has been mostly transferred. Some of the stucco and architectural decoration remains. The ceiling is frescoed by Baciccio.

Bibliography
M. Armellini, Le chiese di Roma dal secolo IV al XIX, Roma 1891
C. Hulsen, Le chiese di Roma nel Medio Evo, Firenze 1927

See also
 List of Jesuit sites

Deconsecrated Roman Catholic churches in Rome
17th-century Roman Catholic church buildings in Italy
Churches of Rome (rione Pigna)